GE 235 may refer to:

 a model in the GE-200 series computers
 TransAsia Airways Flight 235